The Terekty River, also known under the Sinified spelling Tielieketi, is a small river that flows from China to Kazakhstan. In its lower course the river is also known as the Kusak. Along most of its course, the river flows through the very sparsely populated mountainous terrain of the southern part of Xinjiang's Yumin County; by the time it crosses the China–Kazakhstan border and enters a flat desert east of  Lake Zhalanashkol, its bed is usually dry, with little water ever reaching Lake Zhalanashkol. 

The Terekty is mainly known as the site of a Sino-Soviet border conflict that occurred in August 1969.

Geography
In this area, the water flow is seasonal, the river bed being dry most of the year.

A joint Sino-Kazakh boundary commission which demarcated the modern China–Kazakhstan border (defined by a bilateral treaty signed in 1994) installed two  border monuments on both sides of the Terekty (Kusak) River to mark the exact line of the border as it crosses the river.

Meaning of the name, and its other uses
Terekty is a Kazakh adjective derived from terek . Thus, "Terekty River"
() means "Poplar River" (compare the Baiyang River, elsewhere in Xinjiang, whose name means the same in Chinese).

"Terekty" is a fairly common place name in Kazakhstan, used (by itself or in combination with a modifier) for a number of villages, at least one other river, and a mountain pass elsewhere in the country.

Notes

China–Kazakhstan border

Rivers of Xinjiang
Rivers of Kazakhstan